FaroeJet was an airline based in Vágar Airport on the island of Vágar of Faroe Islands. It was the second airline of Faroe Islands, the other one being Atlantic Airways. The airline ceased all operations on December 15, 2006, because of financial problems.

History 

It was founded by private companies and investors in December 2005. The first flight was carried out on May 15, 2006, with an Avro RJ100 leased from BAE Systems, serving the route between Copenhagen and Vagar. However, in December 2006, the airline declared bankruptcy and ceased business on January 1, 2007.

Services 
The airline had one 96-seat Avro RJ100 in one-class configuration which served the route Copenhagen, Denmark - Faroe Islands once daily, except for Saturdays.

Fleet 
As of August 2006, the FaroeJet fleet consisted of:

1 Avro RJ100

References

External links

Defunct airlines of the Faroe Islands
2005 establishments in Denmark
Airlines established in 2005
Airlines disestablished in 2006
2006 disestablishments in Denmark